Andy Flounders (born 13 December 1963) is an English former footballer who played as a forward.

Flounders began his career with his local club Hull City and was a regular presence in the side managed by Brian Horton that won promotion to the Third Division in 1983 and to the Second Division in 1985.

He joined Scunthorpe United during the 1986–87 season and continued his prolific scoring form, which was maintained when he joined Rochdale in 1991. Loan spells at Rotherham United and Carlisle United and a brief stay at Northampton Town and Guangdong Hongyuan (between March and April 1995) followed before he joined North Ferriby United.

External links
Career Stats

1963 births
Living people
Footballers from Kingston upon Hull
English footballers
Hull City A.F.C. players
Scunthorpe United F.C. players
Rochdale A.F.C. players
Rotherham United F.C. players
Carlisle United F.C. players
Northampton Town F.C. players
North Ferriby United A.F.C. players
Expatriate footballers in China
Association football forwards